The 2004–05 FIBA Europe League was the second season of the third tier in European basketball. A total of 32 teams participated in the regular season. BC Dynamo Saint Petersburg won its first FIBA Europe League title.

Teams 
The labels in the parentheses show how each team qualified for the place of its starting round

 1st, 2nd, etc.: League position after Playoffs
 WC : Wild card

Qualifying round

Group A

Group B

Group C

Group D

Play-offs

See also 

 2004-05 Euroleague
 2004-05 ULEB Cup
 2004–05 FIBA Europe Cup

References

External links
Season review at the EuroChallenge site

Euro
FIBA EuroChallenge seasons